Lalaïna Henintsoa Nomenjanahary (born 16 January 1986) is a Malagasy professional footballer who plays as a midfielder for  club Paris 13 Atletico and the Madagascar national team.

Personal life
Nomenjanahary grew up in a poor family in Antananarivo and during his youth he sold toys that he made from recycled tin cans. He is married to Julia and since arriving in France most of his and his wife's family live there as well. Nomenjanahary is sometimes referred to by his childhood nickname Bolida. He is good friends with fellow Malagassy footballer Faneva Andriatsima, and he looks up to Hervé Arsène as a mentor.

Club career
Early on, Nomenjanahary gained attention as a mobile defender. His first club was Ajesaia before he moved to JS Saint-Pierroise on the nearby island of Réunion.

On the advice of fellow Malagasy player Hervé Arsène, Nomenjanahary decided to sign for Arsène's former club RC Lens in 2012. After two seasons,  Nomenjanahary's impressive performances earned him a new three-year contract, keeping him at the club until 2016. When Lens made their return to the Ligue 1 in the 2014–15 season, Nomenjanahary played 26 of the team's 38 matches, and in the third game of the season he scored the only goal in a shock 1–0 win over Olympique Lyonnais. Despite this, Lens ended the season as the bottom of the table team and were relegated. On 11 May 2016, after four years with Lens, Nomenjanahary was released from the team at the end of his contract.

On 9 September 2016, Nomenjanahary joined fellow Ligue 2 team Paris FC on a one-year contract. On 10 October 2016, Nomenjanahary scored his first goals for Paris as he netted a brace in a 7–0 victory over Val d'Europe in the fifth round of the Coupe de France.

In 2021, after his Paris FC contract expired, he joined 4th tier side Paris 13 Atletico.

International career
As of October 2015 Nomenjanahary has made 26 appearances for Madagascar's national football team and scored 2 goals. He has said that it is his dream for Madagascar to qualify for the 2018 FIFA World Cup.
He played at 2019 Africa Cup of Nations when Madagascar made a sensational advance to the quarterfinals.

Career statistics

Club

International

Scores and results list Madagascar's goal tally first, score column indicates score after each Nomenjanahary goal.

Honours
Ajesaia
 THB Champions League: 2007, 2009
 Super Coupe de Madagascar: 2007; 2009
 Coupe de Madagascar: 2006

Madagascar
 Football at the Indian Ocean Island Games silver medal: 2007

Madagascar U20
 COSAFA CUP U20: COSAFA U-20 Challenge Cup 2005

Individual
 Best Player of the THB Champions League: 2007
 Lens Player of the year: 2012
 Ligue 2 Player of the Month: September 2018
Trophy OFC: Finalist for African Player revelation of the year: 2019

Orders
 Knight Order of Madagascar: 2019

References

External links

 
 

1986 births
Living people
People from Antananarivo
Association football fullbacks
Association football wingers
Malagasy footballers
Madagascar international footballers
Ajesaia players
CS Avion players
RC Lens players
Paris FC players
Paris 13 Atletico players
Ligue 1 players
Ligue 2 players
Championnat National players
Championnat National 2 players
Championnat National 3 players
Malagasy expatriate footballers
Malagasy expatriate sportspeople in France
Expatriate footballers in France
Expatriate footballers in Réunion
2019 Africa Cup of Nations players
Recipients of orders, decorations, and medals of Madagascar